Neduva  is a census town in Malappuram district in the state of Kerala, India.

Demographics
 India census, Neduva had a population of 30500 with 14569 males and 15931 females.

Transportation
The nearest airport is Calicut Airport near Kondotty, Malappuram district.  The nearest major railway station is at Parappanangadi.

References

Cities and towns in Malappuram district
Populated coastal places in India
Parappanangadi area